Events in chess in 2005:

Deaths
January 2 – Arnold Denker (1914–2005), 90, American Grandmaster.
January 3 – László Vadász (1948–2005), 56, Hungarian Grandmaster.
March 14 – Simon Webb (1949–2005), 55, British International Master, International Correspondence Chess Grandmaster, and chess writer.
April 9 – Dragoljub Minić (1937–2005), 68, Yugoslavian/Croatian Grandmaster.
April 22 – Leonid Shamkovich (1923–2005), 81, Russian/American Grandmaster.
June 1 – Vladimir Savon (1940–2005), 64, Soviet/Ukrainian Grandmaster, USSR Champion 1971.
November 3 – Hrvoje Bartolović (1932–2005), 73, Croatian Grandmaster of Chess Composition and International Judge of Chess Compositions.
November 12 – Dragutin Sahovic (1940–2005), 65, Serbian Grandmaster.
November 17 – Igor Vasilyevich Ivanov (1947–2005), 58, Russian/Canadian Grandmaster.
December 15 – Enrico Paoli (1908–2005), 97, Italian Grandmaster, established the Reggio Emilia chess tournament.
December – Béla Berger (1931–2005), 74, Hungary/Australia.

References

 
21st century in chess
Chess by year